Caroline Tran (born c. 1971) is an Australian radio announcer on the national youth broadcaster Triple J.

She moved to Melbourne, Australia, from Vietnam with her family when she was three.  As an adult, she worked several other jobs before getting involved with radio broadcasting at the Australian Film Television and Radio School.  She landed the position of SuperRequest host at Triple J in 1999.  After two years she switched to the weekday lunch timeslot in 2001, and as of 2003 she switched to the weekend breakfast slot.

Tran is closely involved with Triple J's Australian music area.  She has performed spot live broadcasts (typically on a mobile phone from live show) for the Australian music show Home and Hosed, and has also been a relief host for the show.

In 2006 Caroline took over hosting Home and Hosed from Robbie Buck, who moved to the afternoon 'drive' timeslot.

At the end of 2008, Caroline announced that the final show of Home and Hosed for 2008, would be her last show, as she would be taking maternity leave.

From May 2010 she has returned to the Triple J airwaves presenting weekend breakfast.

External links
Caroline Tran's page on the Triple J site

1973 births
Triple J announcers
Australian women radio presenters
Living people
Australian people of Vietnamese descent